Vicia narbonensis, called Narbon bean, Narbon vetch, Narbonne vetch and moor's pea, is a widely distributed species of flowering plant in the family Fabaceae. It is native to Madeira and the Mediterranean countries through to Central Asia and the western Himalayas, and has been introduced to central and eastern Europe, and scattered other locations. It has some palatability issues, but has potential as a green manure and forage crop, and for its beans. It is the namesake of the Vicia narbonensis species complex.

References

narbonensis
Flora of Madeira
Flora of North Africa
Flora of Southwestern Europe
Flora of Southeastern Europe
Flora of Hungary
Flora of Western Asia
Flora of the Crimean Peninsula
Flora of the Caucasus
Flora of Central Asia
Flora of Pakistan
Flora of West Himalaya
Taxa named by Carl Linnaeus
Plants described in 1753